Izvorani may refer to several villages in Romania:

 Izvorani, a village in the town of Ştefăneşti, Argeș County
 Izvorani, a village in Ciolpani Commune, Ilfov County